Jurbise is a municipality of Wallonia located in the province of Hainaut, Belgium. 

On 1 January 2006 the municipality had 9,571 inhabitants. The total area is 57.86 km², giving a population density of 165 inhabitants per km².

The municipality consists of the following districts: Erbaut, Erbisœul, Herchies, Jurbise, Masnuy-Saint-Jean, and Masnuy-Saint-Pierre.

The village is located along N56 road.

Notable people
Jacqueline Galant

References

External links
 

Municipalities of Hainaut (province)